The Greco-Roman civilization (also Greco-Roman culture; spelled Graeco-Roman in the Commonwealth), as understood by modern scholars and writers, includes the geographical regions and countries that culturally—and so historically—were directly and intimately influenced by the language, culture, government and religion of the Greeks and Romans. A better-known term is classical civilization. In exact terms the area refers to the "Mediterranean world", the extensive tracts of land centered on the Mediterranean and Black Sea Basins, the "swimming pool and spa" of the Greeks and the Romans, in which those peoples' cultural perceptions, ideas, and sensitivities became dominant in classical antiquity.

That process was aided by the universal adoption of Greek as the language of intellectual culture and commerce in the Eastern Mediterranean and of Latin as the language of public administration and of forensic advocacy, especially in the Western Mediterranean.

Greek and Latin were never the native languages of many or most of the rural peasants, who formed the great majority of the Roman Empire's population, but they became the languages of the urban and cosmopolitan elites and the Empire's lingua franca, even if only as corrupt or multifarious dialects for those who lived within the large territories and populations outside the Macedonian settlements and the Roman colonies. All Roman citizens of note and accomplishment, regardless of their ethnic extractions, spoke and wrote in Greek or Latin. Examples include the Roman jurist and imperial chancellor Ulpian, who was of Phoenician origin; the mathematician and geographer Claudius Ptolemy, who was of Greco-Egyptian origin; and the famous post-Constantinian thinkers John Chrysostom and Augustine, who were of Syrian and Berber origins respectively. Note too the historian Josephus Flavius, who was of Jewish origin but spoke and wrote in Greek.

Cores

Based on the above definition, the "cores" of the Greco-Roman world can be confidently stated to have been the Italian Peninsula, Greece, Cyprus, the Iberian Peninsula, the Anatolian Peninsula (modern-day Turkey), Gaul (modern-day France), the Syrian region (modern-day Levantine countries of Israel, Central and Northern Syria, Lebanon and Palestine), Egypt and Roman Africa (corresponding to modern-day Tunisia, Eastern Algeria and Western Libya). Occupying the periphery of that world were the so-called "Roman Germany" (the modern-day Alpine countries of Austria and Switzerland and the Agri Decumates, the territory between the Main, Rhine and Danube Rivers), the Illyricum (modern-day Northern Albania, Montenegro, Bosnia and Herzegovina and the coast of Croatia), the Macedonian region, Thrace (corresponding to modern-day Southeastern Bulgaria, Northeastern Greece and the European portion of Turkey), Moesia (roughly corresponding to modern-day Central Serbia, Kosovo, Northern Macedonia, Northern Bulgaria and Romanian Dobrudja), and Pannonia (corresponding to modern-day Western Hungary, the Austrian Länder of Burgenland, Eastern Slovenia and Northern Serbia).

Also included were Dacia (roughly modern-day Romania and Moldavia), Mauretania (modern-day Morocco, Western Algeria and Northern Mauritania), Jordan, Southern Syria and Egypt's Sinai Peninsula) and the Tauric Chersonesus (modern-day Crimea and the coast of Ukraine).

The Greco-Roman world had another "world" or empire to its east, the Persians, with which there was constant interaction: Xenophon, The Anabasis, the March Up Country, the Greco-Persian wars, the famous battles of Marathon and Salamis, the Greek tragedy The Persians by Aeschylus, Alexander the Great's defeat of the Persian emperor Darius III and conquest of the Persian empire, or the later Roman generals' difficulties with the Persian armies, such as Pompey the Great, and of Marcus Licinius Crassus (conqueror of the slave general Spartacus), who was defeated in the field by a Persian force and was beheaded by them.

Culture

In the schools of art, philosophy, and rhetoric, the foundations of education were transmitted throughout the lands of Greek and Roman rule. Within its educated class, spanning all of the "Greco-Roman" eras, the testimony of literary borrowings and influences are overwhelming proofs of a mantle of mutual knowledge. For example, several hundred papyrus volumes found in a Roman villa at Herculaneum are in Greek. The lives of Cicero and Julius Caesar are examples of Romans who frequented schools in Greece.

The installation, both in Greek and Latin, of Augustus's monumental eulogy, the Res Gestae, exemplifies the official recognition of the dual vehicles for the common culture. The familiarity of figures from Roman legend and history in the Parallel Lives by Plutarch is one example of the extent to which "universal history" was then synonymous with the accomplishments of famous Latins and Hellenes. Most educated Romans were likely bilingual in Greek and Latin.

Architecture 

Architecture refers to the art of designing and building. Graeco-Roman architecture in the Roman world followed the principles and style that had been established by ancient Greece. That era's most representative building was the temple. Other prominent structures that represented that style included government buildings like the Roman Senate. The three primary styles of column design used in temples in classical Greece were Doric, Ionic, and Corinthian. Some examples of Doric architecture are the Parthenon and the Temple of Hephaestus in Athens, and the Erechtheum, next to the Parthenon, is Ionic.

Politics

By AD 211, with Caracalla's edict known as the Constitutio Antoniniana, and although one of the edict's main purposes was to increase tax revenue, all of the empire's free men became citizens with all the rights this entailed. As a result, even after the Fall of the Western Roman Empire, the people who remained within the lands (including Byzantium) that the empire comprised continued to call themselves Rhomaioi. (Hellenes had been referring to pagan, or non-Christian, Greeks until the Fourth Crusade.) Through attrition of Byzantine territory in the preceding 400 or so years from perceived friends and foes alike (Crusaders, Ottoman Turks, and others), Constantinople, the capitol of the Byzantine Empire (the Eastern Roman Empire) fell to the Turks led by Mehmed II in 1453. There is a perception that these events led to the predecessor of Greek nationalism through the Ottoman era and even into modern times.

Religion 

Greco-Roman mythology, sometimes called classical mythology, is the result of the syncretism between Roman and Greek myths, spanning the period of Great Greece at the end of Roman paganism. Along with philosophy and Political theory, mythology is one of the greatest contributions of Classical antiquity to Western society.

From a historical point of view, early Christianity was born in the world of Greco-Roman influence which had a massive influence on Christian culture.

See also

Classical Antiquity
 History of Western civilization before AD 500
Classical mythology
Greco-Roman mysteries
Greek and Roman Egypt
Hellenistic Greece
Legacy of the Roman Empire
List of Greco-Roman geographers
Magic in the Greco-Roman world

References

Sources
Sir William Smith (ed). Dictionary of Greek and Roman Geography. London: Spottiswoode and Co, 1873.
Simon Hornblower and Antony Spawforth (ed). Oxford Classical Dictionary. Oxford University Press, 2003.

 
History of the Mediterranean
History of Greek Antiquity by period
Ancient Rome by period
Classical civilizations
Classical antiquity
Western culture
Ancient history by region